Samuel Shapiro may refer to:

 Samuel H. Shapiro (1907–1987), 34th Governor of Illinois
 Samuel Shapiro (Maine politician) (born 1927), Maine politician
 Shmuel Shapiro (born 1974), Singer
 Samuel Sanford Shapiro (born 1930), statistician who developed the Shapiro–Wilk test